Moinabad-e Sofla (also Romanized as Mo‘īnābād-e Soflá; also known as Mo‘īnābād-e Pā’īn) is a village in Tabadkan Rural District, in the Central District of Mashhad County, Razavi Khorasan Province, Iran. At the 2006 census, its population was 348, in 88 families.

References 

Populated places in Mashhad County